Kijevo is a village and municipality in the Dalmatian hinterland, southeast of Knin in the Šibenik-Knin County of Croatia.

The population of the municipality is 417 (2011), with 100% declaring themselves as Croats and Roman Catholics.
Kijevo is an underdeveloped municipality which is statistically classified as the First Category Area of Special State Concern by the Government of Croatia.

Location
Kijevo lies underneath the Dinara mountain, near the source of river Cetina. It is located on the State route D1 between towns of Vrlika and Knin.

History
Thirty-four people from Kijevo died in the World War I.

In World War II, Kijevo became part of the Independent State of Croatia fascist puppet state ruled by Nazi Germany and Italy. In the spring of 1942, the town was liberated by Yugoslav Partisans. The attack resulted in approximately half the village population fleeing the village, and resettling in Slavonia and Syrmia. On January 27, 1943, Kijevo was attacked by Chetniks at a time when there was no military defence in the town, resulting in the deaths of 45 civilians. A total of 209 people from Kijevo died during the war.

Kijevo gained infamy during the Croatian War of Independence in 1990 and 1991 when it became the site of the 1991 siege of Kijevo, which involved the Yugoslav People's Army under Ratko Mladić and the forces of SAO Krajina under Milan Martić who encircled the Croat-inhabited village, defended by an isolated outpost of the Croatian Police. By the end of the year, the enclave was attacked and overrun and the bulk of the population left after the artillery had destroyed much of their settlements. The ethnic cleansing of Croats in Kijevo was later prosecuted by the International Criminal Tribunal for the former Yugoslavia.

References

External links
 Official site

Municipalities of Croatia
Populated places in Šibenik-Knin County